In Korean, sajaseong-eo are four-character idioms, the analog of Chinese chengyu and Japanese yojijukugo, and generally but not always of Chinese origin. They have analogous categorization to the analogs in other languages, such as gosaseong-eo (고사성어; 故事成語) for historical idioms.

External links

 분류:한국어_한자성어 — Korean Wiktionary index of sajaseong-eo.
 Structure of four character idioms — A sample list with English Translations

References

Korean language